"dance" is the 16th single of the Japanese pop singer Miho Komatsu released under the Giza Studio label. It was released 29 May 2002. The single was released on the 5th anniversary of her debut. The single reached #28 in its first week and sold 8,830 copies. It charted for 2 weeks and sold 10,860 copies.

Track list
All songs are written and composed by Miho Komatsu and arranged by Yoshinobu Ohga
"dance"
the song was used as an ending song for NTV show CW Love

"dance" <KENNY'S CLASSIC CLUB MIX>
remix: KENNY (ORIENTA-RHYTHM) for BASEMENT FACTORY PRODUCTIONS
"dance" (instrumental)
 (instrumental)

References 

2002 singles
Miho Komatsu songs
Songs written by Miho Komatsu
2002 songs
Giza Studio singles
Being Inc. singles
Song recordings produced by Daiko Nagato